Dizzy is a nickname, Notable people with the nickname include:

 Hubert Raymond Allen (1919-1987), British Second World War Royal Air Force pilot and writer
 Dizzy Dean (1910–1974), Major League Baseball pitcher
 Dizzy Dismukes (1890–1961), American pitcher and manager in Negro league baseball and during the pre-Negro league years
 Benjamin Disraeli (1804–1881), British Prime Minister
 Dizzy Gillespie (1917–1993), American jazz trumpet player and composer
 Jason Gillespie (born 1975), Australian former cricketer
 Johnny Moore (trumpeter) (1938-2008), Jamaican trumpet player
 Dizzy Nutter (1893-1958), American baseball player
 Dizzy Reece (born 1931), jazz trumpeter
 Dizzy Reed (born 1963), Guns N' Roses keyboardist
 Dizzy Trout (1915–1972), Major League Baseball pitcher

See also 

 Dizzy (disambiguation)
 
 
 Dizzee Rascal, British rapper

Lists of people by nickname